Myliobatis bothriodon is a species of extinct eagle ray that lived for 8.2 million years. It only has one occurrence, which was in Nigeria, during the Eocene epoch. The specimen was found in a Lutetian marine horizon.

References 

Fossil taxa described in 1926
Myliobatis
Fossils of Nigeria